Profundiconus profundorum is a species of sea snail, a marine gastropod mollusk in the family Conidae, the cone snails and their allies.

Like all species within the genus Profundiconus, these cone snails are predatory and venomous. They are capable of "stinging" humans, therefore live ones should be handled carefully or not at all.

Description
The size of the shell varies between 46 mm and 114 mm.

Distribution
This marine species occurs off Japan, Taiwan and New Caledonia.

References

 B.A. Marshall, New records of Conidae (Mollusca: Gastropoda) from the New Zealand region New Zealand Journal of Zoology  Volume 8, Issue 4, 1981; DOI:10.1080/03014223.1981.10427973
 Filmer R.M. (2001). A Catalogue of Nomenclature and Taxonomy in the Living Conidae 1758 - 1998. Backhuys Publishers, Leiden. 388pp
 Tucker J.K. (2009). Recent cone species database. September 4, 2009 Edition
 Tucker J.K. & Tenorio M.J. (2009) Systematic classification of Recent and fossil conoidean gastropods. Hackenheim: Conchbooks. 296 pp.

External links
 The Conus Biodiversity website
Cone Shells – Knights of the Sea
 

profundorum
Gastropods described in 1956